Parmotremopsis is a genus of lichen-forming fungi in the family Parmeliaceae. The genus was circumscribed in 1987 by lichenologists John Elix and Mason Hale.

Species
Parmotremopsis antillensis 
Parmotremopsis phlyctina 
Parmotremopsis uruguayensis

References

Parmeliaceae
Lichen genera
Taxa named by John Alan Elix
Taxa named by Mason Hale
Taxa described in 1987
Lecanorales genera